Grant Leonard Ridgway Tilly  (12 December 1937 – 10 April 2012) was a New Zealand stage, movie and television actor, set designer, teacher and artist.

Life and career
Grant Tilly was educated in Wellington, taking art at Wellington Technical College in the early 1950s. He then attended teachers college in Wellington and Dunedin, specialising in arts and crafts teaching. He was awarded an overseas bursary and studied children's drama in England during the early 1960s, learning from the best, Peter Slade and Brian Way. On his return to New Zealand he tutored drama with Nola Millar and later became a senior acting tutor at New Zealand Drama School.

In 1976, Tilly helped establish Wellington's Circa Theatre, where he acted in a number of plays written by playwright Roger Hall, one of New Zealand's most successful playwrights. He designed the set for Hall's breakthrough hit, the public service satire Glide Time. Tilly is known for his acting role in the follow-up Middle Age Spread and solo rugby play C'mon Black, that playwright Roger Hall wrote with Tilly in mind.

Tilly designed the theatre space of Circa Theatre for the original location in a building in Harris St, and worked with the architects designing the theatre space the new and much larger building that opened in 1994.

Aside from a busy stage career, Tilly acted often for the screen. He made his television debut in the 1967 one-off comedy The Tired Man then ad-libbed alongside playwright Joseph Musaphia on the children's show Joe's World. Tilly's biggest screen roles include that of a headmaster who has an affair in 1979's film adaptation of Middle Age Spread (showbusiness magazine Variety compared him to "an antipodean Woody Allen") and in the 1982 comedy Carry Me Back, as the farmer who must sneak his father's body back home after he unexpectedly dies. Grant Tilly's is the voice in the Oscar-nominated animated Western short The Frog, the Dog and the Devil.

His television credits include an award-winning performance as artist Toss Woollaston in the teleplay Erua, Reverend Henry Williams in the historical epic The Governor, the Margaret Mahy fantasy Cuckooland (1995), and a starring role in 2009 short Roof Rattling. Tilly also had many smaller parts in feature films, including two adventures shot partly or wholly in New Zealand: he was "The Collector" in the chase movie Race for the Yankee Zephyr, and a villainous German officer in Savage Islands (also known as Nate and Hayes).

In addition to acting, Tilly worked as an illustrator and writer for the Wellington newspaper Evening Post in the 1970's and 1980's. Amongst his artistic outputs were artworks encompassing prints, drawings, three-dimensional artworks made with wood and furniture. His "Drawing on History" articles focused on the changing face of Wellington's urban landscape.

In the 1988 New Year Honours, Tilly was appointed a Member of the Order of the British Empire, for services to the theatre.

In 2002, Tilly donated his skill to design a flexible 90-seat performance space for Stagecraft Theatre (a non-professional theatre company in Wellington). The Ngā Whakarākei O Whātaitai / Wellington Theatre Awards annually an award called The Grant Tilly Actor of the Year.

Death 
In April 2012, Tilly died from prostate and kidney cancer after being bedridden since January. He was 74 years old and cremated in Wellington.

Filmography and television appearances

Gone Up North for a While (1972, TV Movie) – Doctor
Telephone Etiquette (1974) – Jenkins
Skin Deep (1978) – Phil Barrett
The Les Deverett Variety Hour (1978, TV Series) – Various Characters
Middle Age Spread (1979) – Colin
Beyond Reasonable Doubt (1980) – David Morris
Race for the Yankee Zephyr (1981) – Collector
Carry Me Back (1982) – Arthur Donovan
Savage Islands (1983) – Count Von Rittenberg
Other Halves (1984) – Dr. Wray
Dangerous Orphans (1985) – Beck
Cuckoo Land (1986, TV Series) – Branchy
Warm Nights on a Slow Moving Train (1988) – Politician
The Ray Bradbury Theatre (1989) – Stockwell
The Returning (1990) – Dr. Pitts
Shark in the Park (1990, TV Series) – Inspector Englebretsen
Alex (1992) – Mr. Upjohn
Mirror, Mirror (1995, TV Series) – Sir Gerald Salisbury
Flight of the Albatross (1995) – Narrator (voice)
Brilliant Lies (1996) – Steve Lovett
Every Woman's Dream (1996, TV Movie) – Phil Dobrowski
Hercules: The Legendary Journeys (1997, TV Series) – Toth
The Chosen (1998, TV Movie) – Father McCrory
The Legend of William Tell (1998, TV Series) – Mondar
Dark Knight (2000, TV Series) – Fadain
Turangawaewae (2002, Short) – Mr. Finch
The Strip (2002–2003, TV Series) – Ken Walker
30 Days of Night (2007) – Gus Lambert
Roof Rattling (2010, Short) – Old Man

References

External links

"Grant Tilly: A career on screen and stage" NZonscreen. 29 March 2010. Retrieved 24 November 2010.
"Grant Tilly: biography" at South Coast Gallery.

1937 births
New Zealand male film actors
New Zealand male television actors
New Zealand artists
2012 deaths
Deaths from prostate cancer
Deaths from kidney cancer
Deaths from cancer in New Zealand
New Zealand Members of the Order of the British Empire
Male actors from Wellington City
Male actors from Sydney
Australian emigrants to New Zealand